Purus and Purús may refer to the following :

Places and jurisdictions in the Amazon basin
 Purus River or Rio Purús, a tributary of the Amazon River in South America
 Purús Communal Reserve in Peru
 Purús Province in Peru
 Purús District in above Purús Province and in the Ucayali Region
 Purus National Forest in Amazonas state, Brazil

Other 
 Latin for pure, as in  Actus purus
 plural of Puru (Vedic tribe)

See also 
 Places and jurisdictions
 Alto Purús National Park in Peru
 Médio Purus Extractive Reserve in Amazonas state, Brazil
 Piagaçu-Purus Sustainable Development Reserve in Brazil
 Santa Rosa do Purus National Forest in Acre state, Brazil
 the former Territorial Prelature of Acre and Purus (now Roman Catholic Diocese of Rio Branco) in Brazil

 Animal species
 Purus jacamar or Chestnut jacamar (Galbalcyrhynchus purusianus)
 Purus red howler (Alouatta puruensis)
 Rio Purus titi (Callicebus purinus)
 Purussaurus, a prehistoric reptile

Animal common name disambiguation pages